Sport Singapore (SportSG) is a statutory board under the Ministry of Culture, Community and Youth of the Government of Singapore. It is the lead agency tasked with developing a holistic sports culture for the nation.

History
Sport Singapore was founded on 1 October 1973 as the Singapore Sports Council (SSC), through the merger of the National Sports Promotion Board (NSPB) and the National Stadium Corporation (NSC). On 1 April 2014, the SSC was renamed Sport Singapore in a rebranding exercise.

Safe Sport Commission 
In 2019, the SafeSport Commission was set up by Sport Singapore in partnership with the Ministry of Social and Family Development, the Singapore Police Force, and the Singapore Ministry of Education in 2019 to clamp down on the abuse and harassment of athletes in sport.

See also
 Singapore Sports Hub

References

External links
 Official site of Sport Singapore

Statutory boards of the Singapore Government
Sport in Singapore
2014 establishments in Singapore
Government agencies established in 2014